Whitby—Ajax was a federal and provincial electoral district in Ontario, Canada. It was represented in the House of Commons of Canada from 1997 to 2003, and in the Legislative Assembly of Ontario from 1999 to 2007. It was located to the east of Toronto, consisting of the Town of Whitby and the part of the Town of Ajax lying to the south of Kingston Road.

The federal riding was created in 1996, from parts of Durham and Ontario ridings, while the provincial riding was created in 1999 from Durham Centre, Durham East and Durham West.

The federal electoral district was abolished in 2003 when it was redistributed between Ajax—Pickering and Whitby—Oshawa ridings. The provincial electoral district was abolished in 2007, when it was also redistributed into Ajax—Pickering and Whitby—Oshawa.

Members of Parliament

Federal

Provincial

Electoral history

Federal elections

Provincial elections

See also

 List of Canadian federal electoral districts
 Past Canadian electoral districts

References

External links
 Website of the Parliament of Canada
 Elections Ontario  1999 results and 2003 results

Former federal electoral districts of Ontario
Former provincial electoral districts of Ontario